Lieutenant colonel (Lt Col), is a rank in the British Army and Royal Marines which is also used in many Commonwealth countries. The rank is superior to major, and subordinate to colonel. The comparable Royal Navy rank is commander, and the comparable rank in the Royal Air Force and many Commonwealth air forces is wing commander.

The rank insignia in the British Army and Royal Marines, as well as many Commonwealth countries, is a crown above a four-pointed "Bath" star, also colloquially referred to as a "pip". The crown has varied in the past with different monarchs; the current one being the Crown of St Edward. Most other Commonwealth countries use the same insignia, or with the state emblem replacing the crown.

In the modern British Armed forces, the established commander of a regiment or battalion is a lieutenant colonel.

From 1 April 1918 to 31 July 1919, the Royal Air Force maintained the rank of lieutenant colonel. It was superseded by the rank of wing commander on the following day.

Ceremonial usage
Certain regiments of the British Army have honorary appointments as Regimental Lieutenant Colonel and Deputy Regimental Lieutenant Colonel. These are similar in nature and less in rank to Colonel of the Regiment.

Historical insignia

See also

British and U.S. military ranks compared
British Army Other Ranks rank insignia
British Army officer rank insignia

References 

Military ranks of the British Army
Military ranks of the Royal Marines
Former military ranks of the Royal Air Force